The ambassador of the United Kingdom to Poland is the United Kingdom's foremost diplomatic representative in Poland, in charge of the UK's diplomatic mission.  The official title is His Britannic Majesty's Ambassador to the Republic of Poland.

List of heads of mission

Before Partition

Agents
1604-1610: Dr William Bruce
1609: James Sandilands, 2nd Baron Torphichen Special Ambassador
1610-1621: Patrick Gordon
1626-1641: Francis Gordon
Between 1641 and 1698, there seems to have been no continuous diplomatic representation

Envoys Extraordinary and Ministers Plenipotentiary to the King of Poland
1629-1630: Sir Thomas Roe Special Ambassador
1634-1636: Sir George Douglas
1669-1670: Sir Peter Wyche
1676-1678: Hon. Laurence Hyde

Envoys Extraordinary to the King of Poland and Elector of Saxony
From 1698 to 1763, successive Electors of Saxony were usually Kings of Poland.  There was a single diplomatic mission to the king in both capacities.
1698: George Stepney Special Mission
1700 on: Sir William Brown, 1st Baronet Resident  
1702-1707: Dr John Robinson, Envoy Extraordinary to Sweden was resident in Danzig
1709-1710: John Dalrymple, 2nd Earl of Stair
1710-1714: George Mackenzie (or Mackenzie-Quin) Chargé d'Affaires
1711: Charles Whitworth
1711 and 1712: The Earl of Peterborough
1711-1715: James Scott
1715-1718: Sir Richard Vernon, 3rd Baronet
1718-1719: Lieut-Gen. Francis Palmes
1719: Hugh Boscawen M.P. Special Mission, but did not go
1719-1722: James Scott (initially as Minister)
1721-1725: Capt. James Jefferyes Resident at Danzig
1724-1725: John Ernest von Wallenrodt Special Mission to Danzig

1725-1727: Edward Finch Minister Plenipotentiary
1728-1731: George Woodward Resident
1730-1731: Sir Luke Schaub Special business
1732-1735: George Woodward
1735-1738: Denton Boate (Secretary) in charge
1736-1737: Thomas Robinson At Dresden in 1737
1738-1746: Hon. Thomas Villiers
1747-1755: Charles Hanbury Williams
1756-1761: David Murray, 7th Viscount Stormont
1761-1762: William Money in charge
1763-1778: Thomas Wroughton Resident 1762-1769 then Minister Plenipotentiary

Envoys Extraordinary and Ministers Plenipotentiary to the King of Poland

1778-1779: Richard Oakes
1779-?: James Hare
1782-1784: Viscount Dalrymple
1785-1787: Charles Whitworth
1788-1791: Daniel Hailes
1791-1795: William Gardiner (remained at Warsaw until 1798)

In 1795, the remaining Polish territory was partitioned between Prussia, Austria, and Russia, so that there was not a state of Poland until after World War I.

After World War I

Envoys Extraordinary and Ministers Plenipotentiary
1919–1920: Sir Horace Rumbold, Bt.
1920–1928: Sir William Max-Müller
1928–1929: Hon. Sir William Erskine

Ambassadors
1929–1934: Hon. Sir William Erskine
1935–1941: Sir Howard William Kennard
1941–1943: Cecil Francis Joseph Dormer
1943–1945: Sir Owen St. Clair O'Malley
1945–1947: Victor Cavendish-Bentinck
1947–1950: Donald St Clair Gainer
1950–1952: Sir Charles Bateman
1952–1954: Sir Francis Shepherd
1954–1956: Sir Andrew Noble, Bt.
1956–1960: Sir Eric Berthoud
1960–1966: Sir George Clutton
1966–1969: Sir Thomas Brimelow
1969–1972: Sir Nicholas Henderson
1972–1974: Frank Brenchley
1974–1978: Norman Reddaway
1978–1981: Kenneth Robert Comyn Pridham
1981–1983: Cynlais James
1983–1986: Sir John Morgan
1986–1988: Sir Brian Barder 
1988–1991: Sir Stephen Barrett
1991–1996: Sir Michael Llewellyn-Smith
1996–1998: Sir Christopher Hum
1998–2001: John Malcolm Macgregor
2001–2003: Sir Michael Pakenham
2003–2007: Charles Crawford
2007–2011: Ric Todd
2011–2016: Robin Barnett

2016–2020: Jonathan Knott
2020–present: Anna Clunes

See also
List of ambassadors of Poland to the United Kingdom
Poland–United Kingdom relations

External links
UK and Poland, gov.uk

References

 
Poland
United Kingdom